These 84 quarterbacks have started at least one game for the Chicago Bears of the National Football League. They are listed in order of the date of each player's first start at quarterback for the Bears.

Regular season

 * – Indicates that the number of starts is not known for that year for each quarterback

Postseason 

 * – For more information on 1921, see the 1921 NFL Championship controversy.
 ** – The 1932 NFL Playoff Game was an extra game used as a tiebreaker that season prior to the creation of a playoff system the following year.

Team career passing records 
Through the 2020 NFL Season

See also
 Lists of NFL starting quarterbacks

References

External links
 http://www.bearshistory.com/lore/chicagobearsquarterbacks.aspx

Chicago Bears

Starting quarterbacks